Microbathyphantes palmarius, is a species of spider of the genus Microbathyphantes. It is found in Sri Lanka, India, Seychelles, Myanmar, Thailand, and Polynesia.

See also
 List of Linyphiidae species

References

Linyphiidae
Spiders of Asia
Spiders described in 1955